New Riders of the Purple Sage is the self-titled debut album by the American country rock band the New Riders of the Purple Sage. It was released by Columbia Records in 1971, and reached number 39 on the Billboard charts.

New Riders of the Purple Sage is the only studio album by the New Riders to feature co-founder Jerry Garcia of the Grateful Dead on pedal steel guitar. He is also featured on the live albums Vintage NRPS and Bear's Sonic Journals: Dawn of the New Riders of the Purple Sage.

Mickey Hart and Commander Cody play drums and piano, respectively, on two tracks—"Dirty Business" and "Last Lonely Eagle".

Track listing 

All songs written by John Dawson.
"I Don't Know You" – 2:26
"Whatcha Gonna Do" – 3:17
"Portland Woman" – 3:36
"Henry" – 2:36
"Dirty Business" – 7:56
"Glendale Train" – 3:00
"Garden of Eden" – 4:32
"All I Ever Wanted" – 4:37
"Last Lonely Eagle" – 5:12
"Louisiana Lady" – 3:03

Bonus tracks
These songs were recorded live at the Fillmore West and included in the 2003 CD reissue:
"Down in the Boondocks" (Joe South)
"The Weight" (Robbie Robertson)
"Superman" (John Dawson)

Charts

Personnel

New Riders of the Purple Sage
John Dawson – acoustic guitar, vocals
David Nelson – electric guitar, acoustic guitar, mandolin, vocals
Dave Torbert – bass, acoustic guitar, vocals
Jerry Garcia – pedal steel guitar, banjo
Spencer Dryden – drums, percussion
Additional musicians
Mickey Hart – drums, percussion on "Dirty Business", "Last Lonely Eagle"
Commander Cody – piano on "Dirty Business", "Last Lonely Eagle"

Technical personnel
New Riders of the Purple Sage – production
Stephen Barncard – engineering, executive production
Phil Lesh – executive production
Ellen Burke – technician
Michael Ferguson, Alton Kelly – cover art

Notes

References
"Major Releases" partial discography on NRPS official website nrps.net
New Riders of the Purple Sage on deaddisc.com

1971 debut albums
Columbia Records albums
New Riders of the Purple Sage albums
Albums recorded at Wally Heider Studios